InOverOurHeads is a Jewish documentary-style reality television series currently airing on JLTV - the Jewish Life Television network. It is produced in Sharon, Massachusetts and is shot on location in Greater Boston and the New York metropolitan area. The show was originally created for Public-access television, but subsequently was completely revamped for a national audience.

InOverOurHeads is believed to be the first unscripted Jewish reality series. From Date to Mate, which aired on Shalom TV in 2009 utilizes the reality style, but is a fully scripted production featuring professional actors.

Matthue Roth of MyJewishLearning.com calls InOverOurHeads "The Orthodox Jersey Shore. Linda Keenan of the Huffington Post calls the show "The View for Jews".

Premise
InOverOurHeads primarily features Jewish parents in their 20s and 30s who appear to struggle with the challenges of everyday life. Each episode is self-contained and explores a specific subject matter, such as an emotion or Jewish ritual.

While the show is set around an Orthodox Jewish community, the cast members vary in their religious affiliation and level of observance. One cast member, Valerie identifies herself as a Reform Jew, while others vary from Modern Orthodox to Hasidic to an apostate of Orthodox Judaism. The latest cast member, Marc identifies himself as a secular Jew, having been brought up with little knowledge of his Jewish heritage. Marc is also the first single castmember, opening up new avenues for the show to explore Jewish dating and single life.

The show varies from traditional Jewish television programming in that the cast consists neither of professional actors nor subject-matter experts (such as rabbis).

Episodes

References

Television series about Jews and Judaism
2010s American reality television series
2010 American television series debuts
2010 American television series endings